During the 2001–02 Dutch football season, PSV Eindhoven competed in the Eredivisie.

Season summary
PSV failed to defend the Eredivisie title and finished second, five points behind champions Ajax. Manager Eric Gerets left in June that summer, to be replaced by Guus Hiddink.

Kit
PSV's kit was sponsored by Philips.

First-team squad
Squad at end of season

Results

Champions League

Third qualifying round

Group stage

References

PSV Eindhoven seasons
PSV Eindhoven